The ABU Radio Song Festival 2015 was the third edition of the ABU Radio Song Festivals, organised by the Asia-Pacific Broadcasting Union (ABU). Originally a biennial event, the festival organisers changed its format to an annual festival commencing from 2014.  The festival took place on 29 May 2015 in the city of Yangon, Myanmar. Seventeen songs had been submitted to the event organisers, of which only ten songs from nine countries, were selected to perform at the event. The hosts  made their début in the festival.

Location

It was announced that the 2015 ABU Radio Song Festival will take place in Yangon, Myanmar.

Format 
Unlike the format used in the Eurovision Song Contest there are two versions of the Song Festivals, ABU Radio and ABU TV Song Festivals. The ABU Radio Song Festival which will take place on 29 May 2015 coincides with the Radio Asia 2015 event that took place between 28–30 May 2015.

Host broadcaster
Myanmar Radio and Television (MRTV), will be the host broadcaster for the festival on 29 May 2015.

Interval act
The interval acted featured Rosanita Niken, Billy Talahatu and Stella, performing the song "Pusaka".

Participating countries

A total of seventeen countries took part in this years festival. Host country Myanmar made its début in the 2015, festival along with the Maldives and Palestine. Vietnam and Indonesia also returned to the contest after not participating in 2014. However Australia and Iran both withdrew from the contest.

The following entries had been selected by the ABU to participate in the final of the ABU Radio Song Festival 2015.

Did not qualify 
Of the seventeen preliminary entries, ten were selected to proceed to the final of the ABU Radio Song Festival. The remaining three did not qualify (as shown in the following table)

Withdrawn 
The following four countries withdrew their entries to the contest for a variety of reasons.

Other countries 
  and - Radio Australia who participated in the 2012 contest as part of Vanuatu confirmed on 13 March they would not be taking part. However, Commercial Radio Australia, who represented Australia in the ABU Radio Song Festivals have yet to announce their participation plans.

International broadcasts 
Each participating country was invited to broadcast the event across their respective networks and provide commentary in the native languages to add insight and description to the shows.

  – Radio Televisyen Brunei (RTB)
  – Radio Republik Indonesia (RRI)
  – Myanmar Radio and Television (MRTV)

See also 
 ABU Song Festivals
 ABU TV Song Festival 2015
 Asia-Pacific Broadcasting Union
 Eurovision Song Contest 2015
 Eurovision Young Dancers 2015
 Junior Eurovision Song Contest 2015
 Turkvision Song Contest 2015

References

External links 
Official website of ABU Radio Song Festival

2015 in Myanmar
ABU Song Festivals
Burmese culture
2015 in radio
21st century in Yangon
2015 song contests
Festivals in Myanmar